Gizenga is a surname. Notable people with the surname include:

Antoine Gizenga (1925–2019), Congolese politician
Dorothée Gizenga (1961–2022), Congolese politician
Lugi Gizenga (1965–2020), Congolese politician

Surnames of African origin